Luis Regueiro Pagola ( 1 July 1908 – 6 December 1995), sometimes nicknamed Corso, was a footballer, and an Olympian from the Basque Country in the north of Spain.

Football career
He began his career in 1924 playing for Real Unión in the Basque Country.
He then moved to Madrid FC where he played from 1931 to 1936, scoring 53 goals in 92 matches; from 1932 onwards, his teammates included his younger brother Pedro.

After the start of the Spanish Civil War in 1936 La Liga was suspended. In its place Regueiro, was chosen to be captain of the Basque national football team for its tour of Europe. Later, in the 1938–39 season, he and most of the Basque team played under the name CD Euzkadi in Mexico, before moving to other local clubs, Asturias F.C. in the case of Regueiro, and later finishing his career at América where he was a player-manager.

International football
He played 25 times for the Spanish national team, including participating in the World Cup in Italy in 1934 and the 1928 Olympic games.

Later he played 40 times for and captained the Basque national team during its tour of Europe and the Americas.

Personal life
He married Isabel Urquiola in Coyoacán on 11 April 1943. Together they had six children; Luis (who also became a footballer), José Manuel, Juan María, Maite, María Isabel, and Lourdes. After finishing his career in football he had a business dealing in timber which he managed until his death.

Madrid FC
2 Copa del Rey
6 Campeonato Mancomunados

International goals

Scores and results list Spain's goal tally first.

References

External links
 

1908 births
1995 deaths
Spanish footballers
Spanish expatriate footballers
Spain international footballers
1934 FIFA World Cup players
Real Unión footballers
Real Madrid CF players
Club América footballers
La Liga players
Liga MX players
Olympic footballers of Spain
Footballers at the 1928 Summer Olympics
Expatriate footballers in Mexico
Expatriate football managers in Mexico
Spanish expatriate sportspeople in Mexico
Spanish football managers
Club América managers
Sportspeople from Irun
Association football defenders
Exiles of the Spanish Civil War in Mexico
Spanish emigrants to Mexico
Naturalized citizens of Mexico
Basque Country international footballers
Footballers from the Basque Country (autonomous community)